744 Aguntina, provisional designation 1913 QW, is a rare-type carbonaceous asteroid from the outer region of the asteroid belt, about 60 kilometers in diameter. It was discovered by Austrian astronomer Joseph Rheden at Vienna Observatory, Austria, on 26 February 1913.

The dark F-type asteroid, classified as a FX-subtype in the Tholen taxonomic scheme, orbits the Sun at a distance of 2.8–3.5 AU once every 5 years and 8 months (2,062 days). Its orbit is tilted by 8 degrees to the plane of the ecliptic and shows an eccentricity of 0.12.

The period has since been confirmed by an additional observation. According to the surveys carried out by the Infrared Astronomical Satellite, IRAS, the Japanese Akari satellite, and the U.S. Wide-field Infrared Survey Explorer with its subsequent NEOWISE mission, the asteroid's surface has a very low albedo between 0.03 and 0.05 and a diameter estimate that varies between 55 and 68 kilometers.

The minor planet was named for the ancient Roman town, Aguntum, in the Noricum province of the Roman Empire, in what is nowadays mostly Austria. The naming information was given by the discoverer's widow, who was also the daughter of prolific astronomer Johann Palisa. The historic ruins are located close to Lienz in East Tyrol, the home town of the discoverer. In 1912, shortly before the minor planet's discovery, extensive excavations took place at the Roman site which unearthed coins, pottery masks, bronze objects, and painted tombstones.

References

External links 
 Asteroid Lightcurve Database (LCDB), query form (info )
 Dictionary of Minor Planet Names, Google books
 Asteroids and comets rotation curves, CdR – Observatoire de Genève, Raoul Behrend
 Discovery Circumstances: Numbered Minor Planets (1)-(5000) – Minor Planet Center
 
 

Background asteroids
Aguntina
Aguntina
FX:-type asteroids (Tholen)
19130226